Unicode has subscripted and superscripted versions of a number of characters including a full set of Arabic numerals. These characters allow any polynomial,  chemical and certain other equations to be represented in plain text without using any form of markup like HTML or TeX.

The World Wide Web Consortium and the Unicode Consortium have made recommendations on the choice between using markup and using superscript and subscript characters:
When used in mathematical context (MathML) it is recommended to consistently use style markup for superscripts and subscripts.... However, when super and sub-scripts are to reflect semantic distinctions, it is easier to work with these meanings encoded in text rather than markup, for example, in phonetic or phonemic transcription.

Uses 
The intended use when these characters were added to Unicode was to produce true superscripts and subscripts so that chemical and algebraic formulas could be written without markup. Thus "H₂O" (using a subscript 2 character) is supposed to be identical to "H2O" (with subscript markup).

In reality many fonts that include these characters ignore the Unicode definition, and instead design the digits for mathematical numerator and denominator glyphs, which are aligned with the cap line and the baseline, respectively. When used with the solidus, these glyphs are a common substitute for diagonal fractions, such as ³/₄ for the ¾ glyph. This change was made because using markup does not give a good graphic approximation of fractions (compare markup 3/4 with super/sub-script ³/₄). The change also makes the superscript letters useful for ordinal indicators, more closely matching the ª and º characters. However, it makes them incorrect for normal superscript and subscript, and so chemical and algebraic formulas are better rendered by using markup.

Unicode intended that diagonal fractions be rendered by a different mechanism: the fraction slash U+2044 is visually similar to the solidus, but when used with the ordinary digits (not the superscripts and subscripts), it instructs the layout system that a fraction such as ¾ is to be rendered using automatic glyph substitution. User-end support was quite poor for a number of years, but browsers and fonts increasingly support the intended Unicode behavior. A selection of supporting fonts is displayed in the table below. (These will not display properly if you do not have the fonts installed, or if your browser does not support this behavior.)

Superscripts and subscripts block 

The most common superscript digits (1, 2, and 3) were in ISO-8859-1 and were therefore carried over into those positions in the Latin-1 range of Unicode. The two tables below show these characters. Each superscript or subscript character is preceded by a normal x to show the subscripting/superscripting. The table on the left contains the actual Unicode characters; the one on the right contains the equivalents using HTML markup for the subscript or superscript.

Other superscript and subscript characters 
Unicode version 15.0 also includes subscript and superscript characters that are intended for semantic usage, in the following blocks:
Superscript
 The Latin-1 Supplement block contains the feminine and masculine ordinal indicators ª and º.
 The Latin Extended-C block contains one additional superscript, ⱽ.
 The Latin Extended-D block contains six  superscripts: ꝰ ꟲ ꟳ ꟴ ꟸ ꟹ.
 The Latin Extended-E block contains five superscripts: ꭜ ꭝ ꭞ ꭟ ꭩ.
 The Latin Extended-F block is entirely superscript IPA letters: 𐞁 𐞂 𐞃 𐞄 𐞅 𐞇 𐞈 𐞉 𐞊 𐞋 𐞌 𐞍 𐞎 𐞏 𐞐 𐞑 𐞒 𐞓 𐞔 𐞕 𐞖 𐞗 𐞘 𐞙 𐞚 𐞛 𐞜 𐞝 𐞞 𐞟 𐞠 𐞡 𐞢 𐞣 𐞤 𐞥 𐞦 𐞧 𐞨 𐞩 𐞪 𐞫 𐞬 𐞭 𐞮 𐞯 𐞰 𐞲 𐞳 𐞴 𐞵 𐞶 𐞷 𐞸 𐞹 𐞺.
 The Spacing Modifier Letters block has superscripted letters and symbols used for phonetic transcription: ʰ ʱ ʲ ʳ ʴ ʵ ʶ ʷ ʸ ˀ ˁ ˠ ˡ ˢ ˣ ˤ.
 The Phonetic Extensions block has several superscripted letters and symbols: Latin/IPA ᴬ ᴭ ᴮ ᴯ ᴰ ᴱ ᴲ ᴳ ᴴ ᴵ ᴶ ᴷ ᴸ ᴹ ᴺ ᴻ ᴼ ᴽ ᴾ ᴿ ᵀ ᵁ ᵂ ᵃ ᵄ ᵅ ᵆ ᵇ ᵈ ᵉ ᵊ ᵋ ᵌ ᵍ ᵏ ᵐ ᵑ ᵒ ᵓ ᵖ ᵗ ᵘ ᵚ ᵛ, Greek ᵝ ᵞ ᵟ ᵠ, Cyrillic ᵸ, other ᵎ ᵔ ᵕ ᵙ ᵜ. These are intended to indicate secondary articulation.
 The Phonetic Extensions Supplement block has several more: Latin/IPA ᶛ ᶜ ᶝ ᶞ ᶟ ᶠ ᶡ ᶢ ᶣ ᶤ ᶥ ᶦ ᶧ ᶨ ᶩ ᶪ ᶫ ᶬ ᶭ ᶮ ᶯ ᶰ ᶱ ᶲ ᶳ ᶴ ᶵ ᶶ ᶷ ᶸ ᶹ ᶺ ᶻ ᶼ ᶽ ᶾ, Greek ᶿ.
 The IPA Extensions block has several Latin superscripts: 𐞄 𐞒 𐞖 𐞪 𐞲.
 The Cyrillic Extended-B block contains two Cyrillic superscripts: ꚜ ꚝ.
 The Cyrillic Extended-D block contains many Cyrillic superscripts: 𞀰 𞀱 𞀲 𞀳 𞀷 𞀵 𞀶 𞀷 𞀸 𞀹 𞀺 𞀻 𞀼 𞀽 𞀾 𞀿 𞁀 𞁁 𞁂 𞁃 𞁄 𞁅 𞁆 𞁇 𞁈 𞁉 𞁊 𞁋 𞁌 𞁍 𞁎 𞁏 𞁐 𞁫 𞁬 𞁭.
 The Georgian block contains one superscripted Mkhedruli letter: ჼ.
 The Kanbun block has superscripted annotation characters used in Japanese copies of Classical Chinese texts: ㆒ ㆓ ㆔ ㆕ ㆖ ㆗ ㆘ ㆙ ㆚ ㆛ ㆜ ㆝ ㆞ ㆟.
 The Tifinagh block has one superscript letter : ⵯ.
 The Unified Canadian Aboriginal Syllabics and its Extended blocks contain several mostly consonant-only letters to indicate syllable coda called Finals, along with some characters that indicate syllable medial known as Medials: Main block ᐜ ᐝ ᐞ ᐟ ᐠ ᐡ ᐢ ᐣ ᐤ ᐥ ᐦ ᐧ ᐨ ᐩ ᐪ ᑉ ᑊ ᑋ ᒃ ᒄ ᒡ ᒢ ᒻ ᒼ ᒽ ᒾ ᓐ ᓑ ᓒ ᓪ ᓫ ᔅ ᔆ ᔇ ᔈ ᔉ ᔊ ᔋ ᔥ ᔾ ᔿ ᕀ ᕁ ᕐ ᕑ ᕝ ᕪ ᕻ ᕯ ᕽ ᖅ ᖕ ᖖ ᖟ ᖦ ᖮ ᗮ ᘁ ᙆ ᙇ ᙚ ᙾ ᙿ; Extended block: ᣔ ᣕ ᣖ ᣗ ᣘ ᣙ ᣚ ᣛ ᣜ ᣝ ᣞ ᣟ ᣳ ᣴ ᣵ. 

Combining superscript
 The Combining Diacritical Marks block contains medieval superscript letter diacritics. These letters are written directly above other letters appearing in medieval Germanic manuscripts, and so these glyphs do not include spacing, for example uͤ. They are shown here over the dotted circle placeholder ◌: ◌ͣ ◌ͤ ◌ͥ ◌ͦ ◌ͧ ◌ͨ ◌ͩ ◌ͪ ◌ͫ ◌ͬ ◌ͭ ◌ͮ ◌ͯ.
 The Combining Diacritical Marks Extended block contains two combining letters for linguistic transcriptions of Scots (◌ᪿ ◌ᫀ) and three combining insular letters for the Middle English Ormulum (◌ᫌ ◌ᫍ ◌ᫎ).
 The Combining Diacritical Marks Supplement block contains additional medieval superscript letter diacritics, enough to complete the basic lowercase Latin alphabet except for j, q and y, a few small capitals and ligatures (ae, ao, av), and additional letters: ◌᷒ ◌ᷓ ◌ᷔ ◌ᷕ ◌ᷖ ◌ᷗ ◌ᷘ ◌ᷙ ◌ᷚ ◌ᷛ ◌ᷜ ◌ᷝ ◌ᷞ ◌ᷟ ◌ᷠ ◌ᷡ ◌ᷢ ◌ᷣ ◌ᷤ ◌ᷥ ◌ᷦ ◌ᷧ ◌ᷨ ◌ᷪ ◌ᷫ ◌ᷬ ◌ᷭ ◌ᷮ ◌ᷯ ◌ᷰ ◌ᷱ ◌ᷲ ◌ᷳ ◌ᷴ, Greek ◌ᷩ.
 The Cyrillic Extended-A and -B blocks contains multiple medieval superscript letter diacritics, enough to complete the basic lowercase Cyrillic alphabet used in Church Slavonic texts, also includes an additional ligature (ст):  ◌ⷠ ◌ⷡ ◌ⷢ ◌ⷣ ◌ⷤ ◌ⷥ ◌ⷦ ◌ⷧ ◌ⷨ ◌ⷩ ◌ⷪ ◌ⷫ ◌ⷬ ◌ⷭ ◌ⷮ ◌ⷯ ◌ⷰ ◌ⷱ ◌ⷲ ◌ⷳ ◌ⷴ ◌ⷵ ◌ⷶ ◌ⷷ ◌ⷸ ◌ⷹ ◌ⷺ ◌ⷻ ◌ⷼ ◌ⷽ ◌ⷾ ◌ⷿ ◌ꙴ ◌ꙵ ◌ꙶ ◌ꙷ ◌ꙸ ◌ꙹ ◌ꙺ ◌ꙻ ◌ꚞ ◌ꚟ.
 The Cyrillic Extended-D block has one additional combining character, that being і: ◌𞂏.

Subscript
 The Latin Extended-C block contains one additional subscript, ⱼ.
 The Phonetic Extensions block has several subscripted letters and symbols: Latin/IPA ᵢ ᵣ ᵤ ᵥ and Greek ᵦ ᵧ ᵨ ᵩ ᵪ.
 The Cyrillic Extended-D block also contains many Cyrillic subscripts: 𞁑 𞁒 𞁓 𞁔 𞁕 𞁖 𞁗 𞁘 𞁙 𞁚 𞁛 𞁜 𞁝 𞁞 𞁟 𞁠 𞁡 𞁢 𞁣 𞁤 𞁥 𞁦 𞁧 𞁨 𞁩 𞁪.

Combining subscript
 The Combining Diacritical Marks Supplement block contains a combining subscript: ◌᷊.

Latin, Greek and Cyrillic tables 

Consolidated, the Unicode standard contains superscript and subscript versions of a subset of Latin, Greek and Cyrillic letters. Here they are arranged in alphabetical order for comparison (or for copy and paste convenience). Since these characters appear in different Unicode ranges, they may not appear to be the same size or position due to font substitution in the browser.  Shaded cells mark small capitals that are not very distinct from minuscules, and Greek letters that are indistinguishable from Latin, and so would not be expected to be supported by Unicode. 

Many of the Cyrillic characters were added to Unicode 15, in the Cyrillic Extended-D block, and published in 2022. Most were added to the free Gentium Plus and Andika fonts with version 6.2 in February 2023. 

See also small caps in Unicode.

The Latin Extended-F block was created for superscript IPA letters. They were added to the free Gentium Plus and Andika fonts with version 6.2 in February 2023.

The Unicode characters for superscript (modifier) IPA and extIPA consonant letters are as follows. Characters for sounds with secondary articulation are set off in parentheses and placed below the base letters:

The spacing diacritic for ejective consonants, U+2BC, works with superscript letters despite not being superscript itself: . If a distinction needs to be made, the combining apostrophe U+315 may be used: .

The Unicode characters for superscript (modifier) IPA vowel letters, plus an extended letter found in English dictionaries, are as follows. The two most recently retired alternative letters are also supported; they are set off in parentheses and placed below the standard IPA letters:

Note that the para-IPA letter for a central reduced vowel, is supported, but its rounded equivalent, is not.

The precomposed Unicode rhotic vowel letters  are not supported. The rhotic diacritic should be used instead: .

The two length marks are also supported:

Superscript wildcards (full caps) are partially supported: e.g.  (prenasalized consonant),  (prestopped nasal),  (fricative release),  (epenthetic plosive),  (tone-bearing syllable),  (liquid or lateral release),  (rhotic or resonant release),  (off-glide/diphthong),  (fleeting vowel). However, superscript  for sibilant release and superscript  for fleeting/epenthetic click are not supported as of Unicode 15. Other basic Latin superscript wildcards for tone and weak indeterminate sounds, as described in the article on the International Phonetic Alphabet, are mostly supported: 
.

In addition, a very few IPA letters beyond the basic Latin alphabet have combining superscript forms or are supported as subscripts:

Composite characters 
Primarily for compatibility with earlier character sets, Unicode contains a number of characters that compose super- and subscripts with other symbols. In most fonts these render much better than attempts to construct these symbols from the above characters or by using markup.
 The Latin-1 Supplement block contains the precomposed fractions ½, ¼, and ¾. The copyright © and registered trademark signs ® are also in this block.
 The General Punctuation block contains the permille sign ‰ and the per-ten-thousand sign ‱, and Basic Latin has the percent sign %.
 The Number Forms block contains several precomposed fractions: ⅐ ⅑ ⅒ ⅓ ⅔ ⅕ ⅖ ⅗ ⅘ ⅙ ⅚ ⅛ ⅜ ⅝ ⅞ ⅟ ↉.
 The Letterlike Symbols block contains a few symbols composed of subscript and superscript characters: ℀ ℁ ℅ ℆ № ℠ ™ ⅍.
 The Miscellaneous Technical block has one additional subscript, a subscript 10 (⏨), for the purpose of scientific notation.
 The Unified Canadian Aboriginal Syllabics and its Extended blocks contain several letters composed with superscripted letters to indicate extended sound values: Main block ᐂ ᐫ ᐬ ᐭ ᐮ ᐰ ᑍ ᑧ ᑨ ᑩ ᑪ ᑬ ᒅ ᒆ ᒇ ᒈ ᒊ ᒤ ᓁ ᓔ ᓮ ᔌ ᔍ ᔎ ᔏ ᔧ ᕅ ᕔ ᕿ ᖀ ᖁ ᖂ ᖃ ᖄ ᖎ ᖏ ᖐ ᖑ ᖒ ᖓ ᖔ ᙯ ᙰ ᙱ ᙲ ᙳ ᙴ ᙵ ᙶ, Extended block ᢰ ᢱ ᢲ ᢳ ᢴ ᢵ ᢶ ᢷ ᢸ ᢹ ᢺ ᢻ ᢼ ᢽ ᢾ ᢿ ᣀ ᣁ ᣂ ᣃ ᣄ ᣅ.

Notes

References 

Unicode